The Asus VivoTab Note 8 is a tablet computer by Asus.

References

External links 

 

Tablet computers